Phyllonorycter linifoliella is a moth of the family Gracillariidae. It is known from Morocco.

The larvae feed on Teline linifolia. They probably mine the leaves of their host plant.

References

linifoliella
Endemic fauna of Morocco
Moths described in 1942
Moths of Africa